Defensively equipped merchant ship (DEMS) was an Admiralty Trade Division programme established in June 1939, to arm 5,500 British merchant ships with an adequate defence against enemy submarines and aircraft. The acronym DEMS was used to describe the ships carrying the guns, the guns aboard the ships, the military personnel manning the guns, and the shore establishment supporting the system.

Background
In the eighteenth and nineteenth centuries, European countries such as Spain, France, the Netherlands and Britain armed their merchant ships to prevent capture by pirates, enemy commerce raiders and privateers when they conducted overseas trade. The most heavily armed were ships carrying valuable cargo back from the Far East. Notably the East Indiamen class of ships were constructed from the keel up with defence in mind, with their heavy armament making some of the most powerful examples equivalent to naval Fourth-rate ships of the line. After the end of the Napoleonic Wars in 1815, these were replaced for some of the balance of the 19th century with faster and lighter unarmed ships such as clippers that, in theory, could outrun any threat when blockade running or carrying smaller quantities of the most valuable cargoes long distance.

Anglo-German arms race
From the turn of the 20th century, growing tensions between Europe's Great Powers included an Anglo-German naval arms race that threatened the security of merchant shipping. In December 1911 a memo from Winston Churchill, recently appointed as First Lord of the Admiralty, proposed that the utility or otherwise of arming British merchant ships "for their own defence" be ascertained. The Admiralty created a Committee on the Arming of British Merchant Vessels under Captain Alexander Duff, that reported in May 1912. In October 1912 Admiral Sir Francis Bridgeman became Churchill's First Sea Lord, and that October Bridgeman warned the Committee of Imperial Defence that "the Germans were arming their merchant ships, nominally for the protection of their own trade, but more probably in order to attack ours." The ships being armed by the Kaiserliche Marine were passenger liners that were fast enough to serve as auxiliary cruisers.

The Admiralty chose to do likewise, starting with the Royal Mail Steam Packet Company passenger liner RMS Aragon. She was due to carry naval guns from December 1912, but within the British Government and Admiralty there was uncertainty as to how foreign countries and ports would react. Many merchant ships had been armed in the 18th century and it had never been made illegal, but Britain feared that foreign authorities might refuse to let armed British merchant ships enter port. In January 1913 Rear Admiral Henry Campbell recommended that the Admiralty should send a merchant ship to sea with naval guns, but without ammunition, to test foreign governments' reaction. A meeting chaired by Sir Francis Hopwood, Civil Lord of the Admiralty agreed to put guns without ammunition on a number of merchant ships "and see what happens." Sir Eyre Crowe was at the meeting and recorded "If nothing happens, it may be possible and easy, after a time, to place ammunition on board."

In March the policy was made public, and in April it was implemented. On 25 April 1913 Aragon left Southampton carrying two QF  naval guns on her stern. The Admiralty planned to arm Houlder Brothers'  similarly if the reaction were favourable. Governments, newspapers and the public in South American countries that Aragon visited took little notice and expressed no concern.

There was more criticism in Britain, where Commander Barry Domvile, Secretary to the Committee of Imperial Defence, warned that the policy undermined Britain's objection to the arming of German merchant ships. Domvile predicted that arming merchant ships would be ineffective, and would lead only to a second maritime arms race alongside the naval one. Gerard Noel, a former Admiral of the Fleet, told Churchill that were a merchant ship ever to fire its guns it could be accused of piracy. Churchill replied by drawing a distinction between merchant ships armed as auxiliary cruisers and those armed only for self-defence.

Privately Churchill was more concerned, and in June 1913 he directed Admiralty staff to "do everything in our power to reconcile this new departure with the principles of international law". However, the policy continued. Aragons sister ship RMS Amazon was made the next DAMS, and in the following months further RMSP "A-liners" were armed. They included the newly built , that in the First World War did indeed serve as an armed merchant cruiser.

World War I

During the First World War, the UK blockaded Germany and armed its merchant ships to help defend them against U-boats. A single stern gun, equivalent to what a submarine might carry, was mounted; and civilian captains were encouraged to flee and shoot back from their more stable gun platform. 766 civilian ships had been armed by December 1915. Arming of merchant ships pushed Germany away from prize rules towards unrestricted submarine warfare, an important factor in bringing the United States into the war against Germany.

The first merchant ship lost to U-boats was an 866-ton British steamer outbound from Grangemouth to Stavanger with a cargo of coal, iron plate, and oil.  was stopped by the German submarine U-17 on 20 October 1914; and a boarding party gave Glitras crew time to disembark into lifeboats before sinking the ship by opening valves to flood holds with seawater.  The procedure followed customs originated by surface ships.  International maritime law required the naval vessel to make adequate provisions for the safety of the merchant crew and passengers before sinking their ship.

The German Empire focused use of U-boats against merchant shipping in response to British blockade of German merchant shipping by declaring the entire North Sea a war zone on 2 November 1914. On 5 February 1915 Germany published notice declaring a war zone in all waters around the United Kingdom of Great Britain and Ireland. Within that zone, Germany conducted unrestricted submarine warfare against merchant ships from 18 February 1915 without warning and without regard to safety of their crew.

U-boats still conformed to earlier conventions of stopping ships when possible, but the typical submarine mounted only a single gun. The two procedures for sinking merchant ships were compared in 1915.  Merchant ships escaped 42% of torpedo attacks made without warning, in comparison to 54% escaping from conventional surface attempts to stop the ship. Guns aided escape and about one submarine per month was sunk (most by Q-ships) while attempting a surfaced stop.

The number of civilian merchant ships armed with anti-submarine guns rose to 1,749 by September 1916 and 2,899 by February 1917. The United States responded to unrestricted submarine warfare by severing diplomatic relations with Germany on 3 February 1917. A filibuster in the United States Senate temporarily delayed President Woodrow Wilson's  proposal on 26 February 1917 to arm United States merchant ships, but arming started in March under an executive order.

World War II

Old naval guns had been stored since 1918 in ports for possible use. In the Second World War the objective was to equip each ship with a low-angle gun mounted aft as defence against surfaced submarines and a high-angle gun and rifle-calibre machine guns for defence against air attack. 3,400 ships had been armed by the end of 1940; and all ships were armed by 1943.

The low-angle guns were typically in the 3-inch to 6-inch range (75–150 mm) depending on the size of the ship. Rifle-calibre machine guns were augmented or replaced by Oerlikon 20 mm cannon as they became available. The high-angle QF 12pdr Mk V mount was the most common anti-aircraft gun and later ships sometimes received Bofors 40 mm guns.

Untrained gunners posed significant risk to friendly aircraft in the absence of efficient communications. DEMS guns were manned by 24,000 Royal Navy personnel and 14,000 men of the Royal Artillery Maritime Regiment. 150,000 merchant sailors were trained to assist by passing ammunition, loading and replacing casualties. Initially, Royal Artillery personnel provided anti-aircraft protection by bringing their own machine-guns aboard ships operating close to the British Isles. DEMS gunners were often retired military personnel and young Hostilities Only ratings, commanded by a petty officer or Royal Marine sergeant. Large ships sometimes embarked a junior naval officer to command the DEMS gunners. Canada placed guns on 713 ships, while the Royal Australian Navy provided gun crews for 375 Australian and other Allied ships.

D-day landings and the Royal Observer Corps

In 1944, during preparations for the invasion of France called Operation Overlord there was deep concern over the danger to Allied aircraft from the large number of DEMS involved in the landings. A request for volunteer aircraft recognition experts from the Royal Observer Corps produced 1,094 highly qualified candidates, from which 796 were selected to perform valuable aircraft recognition duties as seaborne volunteers.

These Seaborne Observers were organised by Group Commandant C. G. Cooke and trained at the Royal Bath Hotel Bournemouth before the volunteers temporarily joined the Royal Navy with the rank of petty officer (aircraft identifier). The volunteers continued to wear their ROC uniforms, but wore seaborne shoulder flashes and a Royal Navy brassard with the letters RN. During the D-day landings two seaborne observers were allocated to each of the defensively equipped British and American merchant vessels. The ROC volunteers were given direct control of each ship's anti-aircraft batteries, immediately reducing the previously high level of friendly fire incidents. Their success is measured by a signal from Wing Commander P. B. Lucas, air staff officer who reported:

Twenty two seaborne observers survived their ships being sunk, two lost their lives and several more were injured during the landings. The "seaborne" operation was an unqualified success and in recognition, His Majesty King George Vl approved the wearing of the "seaborne" flash as a permanent feature of the uniform. In addition, ten "seaborne" members were mentioned in despatches. After the invasion and just before his death Air Chief Marshal Trafford Leigh-Mallory wrote the following to be circulated to all ROC personnel:

As of 2010 there is a Seaborne Observers’ Association for the dwindling number of survivors. Air Vice-Marshal George Black (Rtd.), a former Commandant ROC, is the honorary president.

Japan

The Imperial Japanese Army established several shipping artillery units during World War II. These units provided detachments to protect Army-operated transports and chartered merchant ships from air or submarine attack. The Imperial Japanese Navy also formed air defence squads from April 1944 that were deployed on board ships.

United States

The Merchant Marine Act of 1936 identified mariners aboard United States flagged merchant ships as military personnel in time of war. Neutrality Acts prevented arming of United States flagged merchant ships until 17 November 1941, although American-owned ships under Panamanian registry had been armed earlier. Guns were manned by United States Navy Armed Guard. The United States began equipping ships of other nations with guns and United States Navy Armed Guard on 24 January 1942; and approximately 145,000 USN armed guards ultimately sailed aboard 6,236 merchant ships. United States policy was stated by the Vice Chief of Naval Operations on 19 August 1942: "Ships sailing independently should be armed.  Ships sailing in regularly made-up convoys, other than ships bound to North Russia or tankers en route to the United Kingdom, may sail unarmed if the urgency of delivery of their cargo warrants it."

The United States followed the British practice of a single large gun aft.  Early United States installations included low-angle 4"/50 calibre guns (Mark 9) removed from old s and Clemson-class destroyers. The first installations of dual-purpose 5"/38 calibre guns began in September 1942, on new ships over 10,000 tons. Victory ships carried a 3-inch gun on the bow, 20 mm machine gun tubs port and starboard between the first and second holds; a second pair of 20 mm guns on the bridge wings, a third pair on the after edge of the superstructure, and a fourth pair between the after (Number 5) hatch and the 5"/38 calibre gun on the stern.

See also
 Armed merchantmen
 Commerce raiding
 East Indiaman
 Hired armed vessels
 Merchant raider
 STUFT - ships taken up from trade
 Q-ship

Footnotes

References

Further reading
 
 
 
 

Naval warfare
Military strategy
Ship types
History of the Royal Navy
British Merchant Navy